Bow Down is the debut studio album by Westside Connection.

Bow Down may also refer to:

"Bow Down" (Westside Connection song), 1996
Bow Down (1977), a chamber opera by Harrison Birtwistle
"Bow Down" (I Prevail song), 2019
"Bow Down", a song by Chvrches from the album Every Open Eye
"Bow Down/I Been On", later reworked to become "Flawless" (Beyoncé song)
"Bow Down", a song by KSI and Randolph from the 2019 album New Age

See also
Down bow, a type of stroke used when bowing a musical instrument